Each officer rank in the navy of a NATO country may be compared with the ranks used by any military service in other NATO countries, under a standardized NATO rank scale. This is useful, for instance, in establishing seniority amongst officers serving alongside each other within multinational command structures.

The grades, prefixed OF- (commissioned officers) and WO- (warrant officers) were established in the document STANAG 2116, formally titled NATO Codes for Grades of Military Personnel.

In many navies, two separate ranks fall within the OF-1 grade. These particular ranks, known by various names in different navies, are commonly given the less formal grades of "OF-1a" (more senior) and "OF-1b" (less senior).

Officers (OF-1 – 10)

Warrant officers (WO-1 – 5) 
Warrant officers rank below officers and above enlisted servicemen.  In the United States, Chief Warrant Officers are commissioned officers.

WO are used for United States warrant officers only. Countries not listed use only regular officer ranks, do not have warrant officers, or warrant officers are considered OR (Other/Enlisted Rank).

See also
 NATO
 Ranks and insignia of NATO
 Ranks and insignia of NATO armies enlisted
 Ranks and insignia of NATO armies officers
 Ranks and insignia of NATO air forces enlisted
 Ranks and insignia of NATO air forces officers
 Ranks and insignia of NATO navies enlisted

Explanatory notes

References

 

Military ranks of NATO
Naval ranks